Eric K. Meyer (born August 23, 1953) is an American associate professor of journalism at the University of Illinois at Urbana-Champaign. He is also a former associate dean for academic and administrative affairs with the university's College of Media.

Biography 
Meyer was born in Marion, Kansas. His first newspaper was the Meyer Messenger, which he created as a child. He photocopied the homemade newspaper and distributed it to residents of his neighborhood. Meyer earned a bachelor of science degree in journalism from the University of Kansas in 1975 and earned a master of arts degree in journalism from Marquette University in 1998.

From 1975 to 1977 Meyer worked as a Sunday edition editor, assistant news editor and reporter for Illinois' Bloomington Pantagraph, and later as a news photo and graphics editor, assistant news editor, systems editor, copy desk chief and reporter for the Milwaukee Journal, now the Milwaukee Journal-Sentinel, from 1977 to 1994.

Meyer, a former adjunct lecturer at Marquette University, is an associate professor of journalism at the University of Illinois, where he has been a member of the faculty since 1996. His primary duties include teaching information graphics, page layout and design, and online journalism. He also is associate dean for academic affairs and administration in U of I's College of Media.

He is former owner of NewsLink, an online resource to national and international news publication Web sites, including resources to newspapers, magazines, radio, television and blogs. Meyer is president and majority owner of Hoch Publishing Co., publisher of Marion County Record, Hillsboro Star-Journal and the Peabody Gazette-Bulletin. He is the third of three family generations in the newspaper business.

Published works 
Books:
 Designing Infographics (January 1997, Hayden Books).

Other work:
 Executive producer, Project on the State of the American Newspaper (1998–2000).
 Co-publisher, American Journalism Review online (1996–2001).
 Author, Tomorrow's News Today: A Guide to Strategic Planning for Online Publishing (1995–2000, nine editions)

References

External links
 NewsLink
 Faculty Web site
 I-Elect
 College of Communications
 University of Illinois at Urbana-Champaign

1953 births
Living people
People from Marion, Kansas
University of Illinois Urbana-Champaign faculty
Milwaukee Journal Sentinel people